Martina Šamadan (born 11 September 1993) is a Croatian volleyball player. She plays as middle blocker for French club Volley-Ball Nantes.

International career 
She is a member of the Croatia women's national volleyball team. She competed at the  2021 Women's European Volleyball League, winning a silver medal.

References

External links
Martina Šamadan at CEV.eu

1993 births
Living people
Croatian women's volleyball players
Sportspeople from Split, Croatia
Expatriate volleyball players in Romania
Expatriate volleyball players in Italy
Expatriate volleyball players in Germany
Expatriate volleyball players in France
Croatian expatriate sportspeople in Germany
Croatian expatriate sportspeople in France
Mediterranean Games gold medalists for Croatia
Mediterranean Games medalists in volleyball
Competitors at the 2018 Mediterranean Games
21st-century Croatian women